Founded in December 1995, CARRERE is an entertainment and media company specializing in TV movies, series, feature films and animation globally. The company has also produced documentaries in the past.

It created and produced such properties as Flash Gordon, The Nest, Princess Scheherazade, The 3 Wise Men, Argaï, Moby Dick, Malo Korrigan, My Dad the Rockstar, Milo, etc. and built a library of totally nearly 600 hours.

It also distributed such properties as Hello Kitty, The Incredible Hulk, Bionic Woman, Sea Quest, Will and Grace, Dungeons and Dragons, Detective and Judge, Research Unit, Charley and Mimmo etc. in selected territories or worldwide.

The company Carrere participates in many events and shows such as MIPTV Media Market in Cannes, MIPCOM, DISCOP, NATPE, "Le rendez-vous de Biarritz" and Kidscreen summit.

The head office is at 25 rue Saint Didier in Paris (75016). The company is represented by Axel Carrere.

Animation 
 The 3 Wise Men
 Four Eyes!
 Alien Zoo
 Alix
 Argaï
 Arzak Rhapsody
 Bricks'n Brats
 Buddy Buddy
 Cajoo
 Carrot Top
 Christmas Tales
 Cotoons
 A Cow, a cat & the ocean
 Daddy's Gone bats
 Dad'x
 Elias: The Little Rescue Boat
 Flash Gordon
 Gods of Mount Olympus
 The Adventures of Hello Kitty & Friends
 Hoze Houndz
 Jungle Show
 Kartapus
 Katie and Orbie
 Krazy Kitchen Stories
 The Legend of Parva
 Malo Korrigan
 Milo
 Moby Dick
 My Dad the Rock Star
 Panshel
 Phantom Spirits
 Princess Scheherazade
 Prudence Petitpas Investigations
 The Renés
 Rollbots
 Shtoing Circus
 Sam Spoiler
 Tobomoc
 Wombat City
 Yona Yona Penguin

External links
 Official Site

Television production companies of France